Electronic Associates, Inc. (EAI) was founded in 1945 by Lloyd F. Christianson and Arthur L. Adamson and began manufacturing analog computers in 1952.
Their systems were used by NASA to develop space probes and simulate physical systems.
As digital technology matured, they began production of both hybrid digital/analog systems, such as the EAI680 with 156 amplifiers, diode function generators and servo-controlled potentiometers to control input parameters, and digital computers such as the EIA 640.

Under the direction of Robert E. Finnigan, the company developed the first quadrupole gas chromatography–mass spectrometry devices and sold over 500 devices between 1965 and 1966, which accounted for most of the firm's profit.

Other notable employees include Hans Witsenhausen and board member Everard Mott Williams.

In 1963, the company acquired Pacific Data Systems (PDS) from Mesa Scientific Corporation of Inglewood, California. PDS continued to operate as a subsidiary of EAI for several years, manufacturing general-purpose minicomputers built into desks.

References 

 
 

1945 establishments in New Jersey
1999 disestablishments in New Jersey
American companies established in 1945
American companies disestablished in 1999
Analog computers
Companies based in Monmouth County, New Jersey
Computer companies established in 1945
Computer companies disestablished in 1999
Defunct computer companies of the United States
Electronics companies established in 1945
Electronics companies disestablished in 1999
Long Branch, New Jersey
Manufacturing companies based in New Jersey